2,4-Dihydroxybenzoic acid (Resochin, sontochin, SN-7619, β-resorcylic acid) is a dihydroxybenzoic acid.

As a resorcylic acid, it is one of the three isomeric crystalline acids that are both carboxyl derivatives of resorcinol and dihydroxy derivatives of benzoic acid.

It is a degradation product of cyanidin glycosides from tart cherries in cell cultures. It is also a metabolite found in human plasma after cranberry juice consumption.

Resochin is especially effective against avian malaria. Because the initial testing during the chemical development process used avian malaria its efficacy was recognised immediately.

References

Dihydroxybenzoic acids